Past Times was a United Kingdom high street retailer, specialising in gifts and retro style goods. It was established as a mail order company in 1986 by John Beale, who was also the developer of the Early Learning Centre. In June 1987, the company opened the first branch in Oxford.

The firm went into administration in January 2012 and in March 2013 the brand name was bought by WHSmith. Past Times' website was taken down following the purchase.

References

External links
 Page from Past Times website, archived at the Wayback Machine

British companies established in 1987
British companies disestablished in 2012
Companies that have entered administration in the United Kingdom
Retail companies of the United Kingdom
Retail companies established in 1987
Retail companies disestablished in 2012
Defunct retail companies of the United Kingdom
1987 establishments in the United Kingdom